Viver a Vida (literally: Living Life, English title: Seize the Day) is a Brazilian telenovela broadcast by TV Globo  from September 14, 2009 to May 14, 2010. It is written by Manoel Carlos in collaboration with Ângela Chaves, Cláudia Lage, Daisy Chaves, Juliana Perez and Maria Carolina. Directed by Teresa Lamprey, Frederico Mayrink, Luciano Sabino, Leonardo Nogueira, Adriano Mello and Maria José Rodrigues. It is directed by Jayme Monjardim and Fabrício Mamberti. Topbilled by Taís Araújo, José Mayer, Lília Cabral and Alinne Moraes and Mateus Solano. Originally it ran for 209 episodes but internationally the episodes are condensed into 100.

Plot
Luciana is a spoiled model whose envy of supermodel Helena extends beyond the catwalk. As the story unfolds, Helena meets, falls in love and marries Luciana‘s father, Marcos, a womanizer who ends up betraying Helena with Dora.
 
During a trip, a serious accident causes Luciana to become paraplegic, thus changing hers and everybody‘s lives. When her fiancé Jorge can’t handle her disability, she turns to his twin brother and doctor Miguel, who comes to her aid, becoming Luciana‘s hope of recovery. Together, they will face the challenges of overcoming her condition and will fall in love.

Cast

Audience

References

External links

2009 telenovelas
2009 Brazilian television series debuts
Brazilian telenovelas
TV Globo telenovelas
2010 Brazilian television series endings
Brazilian LGBT-related television shows
Portuguese-language telenovelas
Television shows set in Rio de Janeiro (city)
Television series about twins
Alcohol abuse in television